Bangor City Council or officially the City of Bangor Council is an elected community council serving Bangor in Gwynedd, Wales.

Background
Bangor's council was created in 1883 by royal charter. In 1974 it became City of Bangor Council, after Bangor had been granted city status, though many of its previous powers were passed to Arfon Borough Council (1974–1996) and the new Gwynedd Council, based in Caernarfon.

The city council's roles include consultation on all planning applications within the city boundaries, as well as applications for alcohol licenses. Its current responsibilities extend to maintaining footpaths and bus shelters, as well as managing a number of woodland areas and open public spaces.

The city council is most notably responsible for the maintenance of Wales' second longest pier, the Garth Pier. After Arfon Borough Council had decided to demolish it in 1974, Bangor City Council bought the  pier for a nominal one pence. However, in 2012 the council only had £1 million of the estimated £2 million needed to repair it. The council-financed £1 million restoration began in 2017, phased over three to four years.

In addition the city council owns a number of important buildings, including the Town Clock, the City Council Offices and Penhryn Hall (containing the Council Chamber) in Ffordd Gwynedd. It owns Nantporth Football Stadium, which it leases to Bangor City Football Club. It also owns Hafan Drop-in Centre which is managed by Age Concern Cymru as a city centre drop in for the elderly and disabled.

In June 2012 a curfew keeping young people out of Bangor city centre made the UK national news. Bangor City Council had to call an emergency meeting to raise their concerns, because Gwynedd Council and the local police had imposed the curfew without consulting city councillors.

In May 2021 Bangor became the first Welsh city council and the sixteenth in the UK to pass a resolution supporting the Treaty on the Prohibition of Nuclear Weapons.

Representation
Twenty councillors are elected from the eight electoral wards in the city, namely: Deiniol (2), Dewi (3), Garth (2), Glyder (3), Hendre (2), Hirael (2), Marchog (3) and Menai (3). In 2017 half of the seats were won by Plaid Cymru. The eight wards also elect ten county councillors to Gwynedd Council.

Mayor
The council elects a city mayor and deputy mayor annually. The Mayor making for 2020 was delayed by a year due to COVID-19 and both the Deputy Mayor and Mayor were to remain in their posts for another year until 2021.

In May 2021 22-year old Owen J Hurcum was elected mayor, the youngest ever mayor in Wales and also possibly the first non-binary person in the world to hold such a position.

Council composition

References

Community councils of Wales
Bangor, Gwynedd
Government of Gwynedd